Ever Alfaro Víquez (born 1 October 1982 in Grecia) is a Costa Rican professional footballer, who most recently played for Carmelita.

Club career
Alfaro made his professional debut with Municipal Pérez Zeledón and played for Herediano, before having a slow start with Saprissa after a delayed transfer from Herediano with his season ending with a major knee injury.

He moved abroad in January 2011 to play for Mexican side Atlante and later played for Mérida before returning home to join Carmelita.

International career
As of January 2014, Alfaro has made 6 appearances for the Costa Rica national football team, his debut coming in a friendly against Ecuador on 16 February 2005 immediately scoring his first international goal as well.  He appeared in three matches as Costa Rica won the UNCAF Nations Cup 2005 tournament.

His final international was an October 2010 friendly match against El Salvador.

International goals
Scores and results list Honduras' goal tally first.

References

External links
 
 Profile at Nacion.com 
 

1982 births
Living people
People from Grecia (canton)
Association football forwards
Costa Rican footballers
Costa Rica international footballers
Municipal Pérez Zeledón footballers
C.S. Herediano footballers
Deportivo Saprissa players
C.F. Universidad de Costa Rica footballers
Atlante F.C. footballers
Belén F.C. players
C.F. Mérida footballers
A.D. Carmelita footballers
Costa Rican expatriate footballers
Expatriate footballers in Mexico
Liga MX players
Liga FPD players
2005 UNCAF Nations Cup players
Copa Centroamericana-winning players